Dato' Jamal Ubaidillah bin Haji Mohd Ali (born 7 May 1959), known by his stage name Jamal Abdillah, is a Malaysian pop singer and actor with a "bad boy" image.

Jamal began his singing career in 1973. He won Radio Televisyen Malaysia's Bintang RTM competition in 1979. Following his victory, he continued to sing but also appeared in films such as 'Azura'.

Jamal is the eldest of seven siblings. Having married four times, Jamal has two sons, Osama Yamani (known as Yamani Abdillah) and Ahmad Zaki Yamani and a daughter, Nur Azura Yamani.

He is of Banjar descent.

He has performed in Indonesia, Singapore and Brunei Darussalam. He regularly performs charity concerts in Singapore every year.

Discography

Studio album
 Perpisahan Tanpa Relamu (1980)
 Derita Cinta (1981)
 Hatiku Luka Kembali (1982)
 Layang-Layang (1983)
 Sendiri (1984)
 Mati Hidup Semula (1986)
 Untukmu (1988)
 Sepi Seorang Perindu (1989)
 Seniman Menangis (1990)
 Jamal (1991)
 Penghujung Rindu (1994)
 Suratan Kasih / Penawar Kasih (1995 / 1997)
 Samrah (1998)
 Segala Cinta (2002)
 Aku Penghibur (2005)
 Tak Hilang Cinta (2009) 
 Raja Pop 2 (2011)

Single
Aku Maafkan Kamu feat Malique Ibrahim (2011)
Belenggu Rindu feat Wany Hasrita (2019)

Filmography

Film

Television

Telemovie

Legacy
Jamal legacy contiune by Osama and Zaki Yamani as singer, Osama famous song Bunga Seroja in 2019 and he had join Big Stage season 2 same year

References

External links
 

1959 births
Living people
People from Perak
Malaysian male actors
Malaysian people of Malay descent
Malaysian people of Banjar descent
20th-century Malaysian male singers
Bintang RTM winners
21st-century Malaysian male singers